This is a list of bridges and other crossings of the Taunton River, from its mouth at the Mount Hope Bay upstream to its source at the confluence of the Town River and Matfield River, near the Paper Mill Village neighborhood of the town of Bridgewater, Massachusetts.

River source at the convergence of the Town River and the Matfield River:

See also

References

External links

Taunton River
Charles River crossings
Charles River crossings